Gwari is a Nupoid language spoken by the Gbagyi people, which make up over a million people in Nigeria. There are two principal varieties, Gbari (West Gwari) and Gbagyi (East Gwari), which have some difficulty in communication; sociolinguistically they are distinct languages.

Varieties
Gbagye is also known as Gwari-Matai or Gwarin Ngenge, which are recently adopted cover terms.

There are two separate Gbagyi groups living in:
Minna and Kuta (more prominent group)
around Diko, northeast of Suleja

Gbagye is the only Nupoid language that has the bilabial implosive /ɓ/.

Gbagyi (also known as Gwari) is a cover term for all the Gbari-speaking peoples, and includes many varieties.

Gbari-Yama is a cover term used for all southern Gbari dialects. There are two closely related dialects, which are:
Shigokpna
Zubakpna

Gbedegi is an extinct language (possibly a Nupe dialect) spoken near Mokwa (Nadel 1941).

References

Nupoid languages